Cliff College is a Christian theological college in Calver, Derbyshire, that teaches Biblical Theology at the undergraduate level and a number of mission courses to postgraduates. There are currently about 30 full-time undergraduates, 80 part-time undergraduates and 100 part-time postgraduates. There are also a number of research (MPhil and PhD) students and full-time postgraduates enrolled at the College. College courses up to and including MA level are validated by University of Manchester, and students at higher levels are jointly enrolled at both institutions.

History
Cliff College traces its roots back to 1883 in Bolton, Lancashire, when Reverend Thomas Champness took a number of men into his home in order to train them. Shortly afterwards they all moved to Castleton Hall, Rochdale being known as "The Joyful News Training Home and Mission". On the expiration of the lease on Castleton Hall, the work moved to its present site in March 1904. Prior to this, the premises at Curbar, Derbyshire had been used by Henry Grattan Guinness, who moved students from Harley College, in Bromley-by-Bow to Derbyshire. The institution was known as "Hulme Cliffe College" after Elizabeth Hulme, who had donated "Cliffe House" in Curbar, Derbyshire, England to further Guinness's work, this work was transferred back to London in 1902. The premises were purchased by the Wesleyan Methodist Church in 1903, to house the Joyful News Training Home and Mission, and the name was changed to "Cliff College". Today the college trains and teaches undergraduate and post-graduate students at their campus in Calver, Derbyshire.

In the later 19th Century, many of the college's graduates worked with Hudson Taylor and his China Inland Mission as missionaries. Many present day Cliff College graduates choose to do Christian missionary and evangelistic work both in the United Kingdom and abroad.

The Wesleyan Methodist Minister and theologian, Samuel Chadwick, was principal of the college from 1913 to 1932.

See:- Weekly newspaper "Joyful News" issues 22 February 1883 to December 1914, "The Guinness Legend" Michele Guinness 1990, "The Life Story of Thomas Champness" E M Champness 1907, "The Story of Cliff" W Fiddian Moulton 1928, "Cliff More Than a College" G Howard Mellor 2005.

The college hosts the UK headquarters of the Girls' Brigade.

Faculty
Since the summer of 2017, the Principal of Cliff College has been Rev Ashley Cooper. The Head of Academic Strategy and Innovation is Rev Dr Andrew Stobart, and the Head of Academic Delivery is Dr Sandra Brower.

Programmes of study
Undergraduate degrees, Master's degrees and research programmes are validated by the University of Manchester, and the college also run a broad range of short courses, validated by a Cliff College Certificate.

Festival
Each year, over the May Whitsun Bank Holiday (late bank holiday in May), the college holds an annual all age Cliff Festival event which includes worship, bible study, a variety of seminars, entertainment and outdoor activities led by tutors of the college, as well as outside guests.

References

External links
Cliff College website

Bible colleges, seminaries and theological colleges in England
Derbyshire Dales
Education in Derbyshire
Methodist universities and colleges